Gəncəli (also, Ganjali) is a village in the Khachmaz District of Azerbaijan.  The village forms part of the municipality of Khaspoladoba.

References

External links

Populated places in Khachmaz District